David Bus (born May 19, 1978) is a Dutch professional football defender.

Career

De Graafschap
Bus came into professional football relatively late, starting his career at De Graafschap in 2004 at the age of 26 after a few stints at amateur clubs in his hometown, Lichtenvoorde. He became a fan favourite during his first season at De Graafschap. He played 29 games during the 2004/05 season, helping his side get promoted to the Eredivisie. The next season, he played more games and performed better but his efforts were not enough to stop De Graafschap being relegated back to the Eerste Divisie. He only played 15 games in the Eerste Divisie during the 2006/07 season after the arrival of Cerezo Fung a Wing. De Graafschap were once again promoted to the Eredivisie in the 2007/08 season and opted to play a 3-man defence and with captain René Bot, Cerezo Fung a Wing and Stephan Keller the usual starters, Bus was left out in the cold.

Aberdeen
In January 2008 Aberdeen signed Bus on a six-month loan deal with first option to buy if he impressed. He joined fellow Dutchmen Jeffrey de Visscher and Karim Touzani at Pittodrie. At Aberdeen, Bus made limited appearances and even scored an own goal against Inverness CT. On 15 April 2008, he was told he would not be offered a deal to stay at Aberdeen and would be free to return to the Netherlands.

Go Ahead Eagles
In summer 2008, he signed a contract with Go Ahead Eagles of the Eerste Divisie.

He finished his career in 2014 and returned to the amateur ranks to play for childhood and hometown club Longa'30. He runs an online wholesaler in sports supplies.

References

External links
 

1978 births
Living people
Footballers from Oost Gelre
Association football central defenders
Dutch footballers
Eerste Divisie players
Eredivisie players
Scottish Premier League players
De Graafschap players
Aberdeen F.C. players
Go Ahead Eagles players
Dutch expatriate footballers
Expatriate footballers in Scotland
Dutch expatriate sportspeople in Scotland
People from Lichtenvoorde